Amyris Fuels, LLC, is a wholly owned subsidiary of Amyris, a business unit formed to develop a network for supplying and distributing renewable fuels. The company sources current biofuels, such as ethanol, from international producers and brings them to market.

The unit has been focused on the southeastern United States, where Amyris Fuels is establishing relationships with customers and trading partners. When Amyris renewable fuels become more widely available, Amyris Fuels intends to integrate them into a ready-made marketing and distribution system that would offer access to key markets and customers.

In 2016, Amyris Fuels partnered with Cathay Pacific to have A350 flights from Toulouse to Hong Kong fueled using Amyris' renewable jet fuel.

References

Biofuel producers
Biotechnology companies of the United States